Business Recorder is a financial daily newspaper in Pakistan which was founded by M.A. Zuberi. The publication is owned by the Business Recorder Group.

Historical background
Business Recorder was launched on 27 April 1965 by veteran journalist M.A. Zuberi (1920 – 12 December 2010), the newspaper's founder. He was first appointed as an apprentice reporter by Muhammad Ali Jinnah in 1945 at Dawn (newspaper) in Delhi. Before creation of Pakistan in 1947, he had been promoted to the post of Senior Assistant Editor at Dawn (newspaper). He continued to work in that position even in Pakistan until 1964. Then he founded the Business Recorder in 1965 and thus became one of the pioneers of financial journalism in Pakistan.

Business Recorder Group holdings
 Business Recorder (daily business newspaper)
 Aaj News 
 Aaj Entertainment
 Play Entertainment
 A1 TV

Defunct channels
 Play TV
 Play Max

See also 
 List of newspapers in Pakistan
 Pakistan Stock Exchange

References

External links
 

Daily newspapers published in Pakistan
1965 establishments in Pakistan
Newspapers established in 1965
English-language newspapers published in Pakistan
Business newspapers
Mass media in Karachi
Business in Pakistan
Newspaper companies of Pakistan